Concepción Bellorín (born 4 November 1980) is a Spanish judoka. She competed in the Women's 57 kg event at the 2012 Summer Olympics.

References

External links
 
 

1980 births
Living people
Spanish female judoka
Olympic judoka of Spain
Judoka at the 2012 Summer Olympics
Sportspeople from Badajoz
European Games competitors for Spain
Judoka at the 2015 European Games
21st-century Spanish women